Eric Eidel is an American musician who has most notably played with Jeff Buckley on his final album "My Sweet Heart the Drunk". He is currently the drummer of San Francisco garage rock band The Boars.

References

Living people
Year of birth missing (living people)